Yazıköy is a village in the Kocaköy District of Diyarbakır Province in Turkey.

References

Villages in Kocaköy District